Christian fundamentalism, also known as fundamental Christianity or fundamentalist Christianity, is a religious movement emphasizing biblical literalism. In its modern form, it began in the late 19th and early 20th centuries among British and American Protestants as a reaction to theological liberalism and cultural modernism. Fundamentalists argued that 19th-century modernist theologians had misunderstood or rejected certain doctrines, especially biblical inerrancy, which they considered the fundamentals of the Christian faith.

Fundamentalists are almost always described as upholding beliefs in biblical infallibility and biblical inerrancy. In keeping with traditional Christian doctrines concerning biblical interpretation, the role of Jesus in the Bible, and the role of the church in society. Fundamentalists usually believe in a core of Christian beliefs, typically called the "Five Fundamentals," this arose from the Presbyterian Church issuance of "The Doctrinal Deliverance of 1910."  Topics included are statements on the historical accuracy of the Bible and all of the events which are recorded in it as well as the Second Coming of Jesus Christ.

Fundamentalism manifests itself in various denominations which believe in various theologies, rather than a single denomination or a systematic theology. The ideology became active in the 1910s after the release of The Fundamentals, a twelve-volume set of essays, apologetic and polemic, written by conservative Protestant theologians in an attempt to defend beliefs which they considered Protestant orthodoxy. The movement became more organized within U.S. Protestant churches in the 1920s, especially among Presbyterians, as well as Baptists and Methodists. Many churches which embraced fundamentalism adopted a militant attitude with regard to their core beliefs. Reformed fundamentalists lay heavy emphasis on historic confessions of faith, such as the Westminster Confession of Faith, as well as uphold Princeton theology. Since 1930, many fundamentalist churches in the Baptist tradition (who generally affirm dispensationalism) have been represented by the Independent Fundamental Churches of America (renamed IFCA International in 1996), while many theologically conservative connexions in the Methodist tradition (who adhere to Wesleyan theology) align with the Interchurch Holiness Convention; in various countries, national bodies such as the American Council of Christian Churches exist to encourage dialogue between fundamentalist bodies of different denominational backgrounds. Other fundamentalist denominations have little contact with other bodies.

A few scholars label Catholics who reject modern Christian theology in favor of more traditional doctrines as fundamentalists.

The term is sometimes mistakenly confused with the term evangelical.

Terminology 
The term "fundamentalism" entered the English language in 1922, and it is often capitalized when it is used in reference to the religious movement.

The term fundamentalist is controversial in the 21st century, because it connotes religious fanaticism or extremism, especially when such labeling is applied beyond the movement which coined the term and/or those who self-identify as fundamentalists today. Some who hold certain, but not all beliefs in common with the original fundamentalist movement reject the label "fundamentalism," because they consider it too pejorative, while others consider it a banner of pride. Such Christians prefer to use the term fundamental, as opposed to fundamentalist (e.g., Independent Fundamental Baptist and Independent Fundamental Churches of America). The term is sometimes confused with Christian legalism. In parts of the United Kingdom, using the term fundamentalist with the intent to stir up religious hatred is a violation of the Racial and Religious Hatred Act of 2006.

History 
Fundamentalism draws from multiple traditions in British and American theologies during the 19th century. According to authors Robert D. Woodberry and Christian S. Smith,

However, the split does not mean that there were just two groups: modernists and fundamentalists. There were also people who considered themselves neo-evangelicals, separating themselves from the extreme components of fundamentalism. These neo-evangelicals also wanted to separate themselves from both the fundamentalist movement and the mainstream evangelical movement due to their anti-intellectual approaches.

Fundamentalism was first mentioned at meetings of the Niagara Bible Conference in 1878.

From 1910 until 1915, a series of essays titled The Fundamentals: A Testimony to the Truth was published by the Testimony Publishing Company of Chicago.

The Northern Presbyterian Church (now Presbyterian Church in the United States of America) influenced the movement with the definition of the five "fundamentals" in 1910, namely biblical inerrancy, nature divine of Jesus Christ, his virgin birth, resurrection of Christ, and his return.

The Princeton theology, which responded to higher criticism of the Bible by developing from the 1840s to 1920 the doctrine of inerrancy, was another influence in the movement. This doctrine, also called biblical inerrancy, stated that the Bible was divinely inspired, religiously authoritative, and without error. The Princeton Seminary professor of theology Charles Hodge insisted that the Bible was inerrant because God inspired or "breathed" his exact thoughts into the biblical writers (2 Timothy 3:16). Princeton theologians believed that the Bible should be read differently than any other historical document, and they also believed that Christian modernism and liberalism led people to Hell just like non-Christian religions did.

Biblical inerrancy was a particularly significant rallying point for fundamentalists. This approach to the Bible is associated with conservative evangelical hermeneutical approaches to Scripture, ranging from the historical-grammatical method to biblical literalism.

The Dallas Theological Seminary, founded in 1924 in Dallas, will have a considerable influence in the movement by training students who will establish various independent Bible Colleges and fundamentalist churches in the southern United States.

In the 1930s, fundamentalism was viewed by many as a "last gasp" vestige of something from the past but more recently, scholars have shifted away from that view.

Changing interpretations 

The interpretations given the fundamentalist movement have changed over time, with most older interpretations being based on the concepts of social displacement or cultural lag. Some in the 1930s, including H. Richard Niebuhr, understood the conflict between fundamentalism and modernism to be part of a broader social conflict between the cities and the country. In this view the fundamentalists were country and small-town dwellers who were reacting against the progressivism of city dwellers. Fundamentalism was seen as a form of anti-intellectualism during the 1950s; in the early 1960s American intellectual and historian Richard Hofstadter interpreted it in terms of status anxiety.

Beginning in the late 1960s, the movement began to be seen as "a bona fide religious, theological and even intellectual movement in its own right." Instead of interpreting fundamentalism as a simple anti-intellectualism, Paul Carter argued that "fundamentalists were simply intellectual in a way different than their opponents." Moving into the 1970s, Earnest R. Sandeen saw fundamentalism as arising from the confluence of Princeton theology and millennialism.

George Marsden defined fundamentalism as "militantly anti-modernist Protestant evangelicalism" in his 1980 work Fundamentalism and American Culture. "Militant" in this sense does not mean "violent," it means "aggressively active in a cause." Marsden saw fundamentalism arising from a number of preexisting evangelical movements that responded to various perceived threats by joining forces. He argued that Christian fundamentalists were American evangelical Christians who in the 20th century opposed "both modernism in theology and the cultural changes that modernism endorsed. Militant opposition to modernism was what most clearly set off fundamentalism." Others viewing militancy as a core characteristic of the fundamentalist movement include Philip Melling, Ung Kyu Pak and Ronald Witherup. Donald McKim and David Wright (1992) argue that "in the 1920s, militant conservatives (fundamentalists) united to mount a conservative counter-offensive. Fundamentalists sought to rescue their denominations from the growth of modernism at home."

According to Marsden, recent scholars differentiate "fundamentalists" from "evangelicals" by arguing the former were more militant and less willing to collaborate with groups considered "modernist" in theology. In the 1940s the more moderate faction of fundamentalists maintained the same theology but began calling themselves "evangelicals" to stress their less militant position. Roger Olson (2007) identifies a more moderate faction of fundamentalists, which he calls "postfundamentalist," and says "most postfundamentalist evangelicals do not wish to be called fundamentalists, even though their basic theological orientation is not very different." According to Olson, a key event was the formation of the National Association of Evangelicals (NAE) in 1942. Barry Hankins (2008) has a similar view, saying "beginning in the 1940s....militant and separatist evangelicals came to be called fundamentalists, while culturally engaged and non-militant evangelicals were supposed to be called evangelicals."

Timothy Weber views fundamentalism as "a rather distinctive modern reaction to religious, social and intellectual changes of the late 1800s and early 1900s, a reaction that eventually took on a life of its own and changed significantly over time."

By region

In North America 
Fundamentalist movements existed in most North American Protestant denominations by 1919 following attacks on modernist theology in Presbyterian and Baptist denominations. Fundamentalism was especially controversial among Presbyterians.

In Canada 
In Canada, fundamentalism was less prominent, but an early leader was English-born Thomas Todhunter Shields (1873–1955), who led 80 churches out of the Baptist federation in Ontario in 1927 and formed the Union of Regular Baptist Churches of Ontario and Quebec. He was affiliated with the Baptist Bible Union, based in the United States. His newspaper, The Gospel Witness, reached 30,000 subscribers in 16 countries, giving him an international reputation. He was one of the founders of the international Council of Christian Churches.

Oswald J. Smith (1889–1986), reared in rural Ontario and educated at Moody Church in Chicago, set up The Peoples Church in Toronto in 1928. A dynamic preacher and leader in Canadian fundamentalism, Smith wrote 35 books and engaged in missionary work worldwide. Billy Graham called him "the greatest combination pastor, hymn writer, missionary statesman, an evangelist of our time."

In the United States 

A leading organizer of the fundamentalist campaign against modernism in the United States was William Bell Riley, a Northern Baptist based in Minneapolis, where his Northwestern Bible and Missionary Training School (1902), Northwestern Evangelical Seminary (1935), and Northwestern College (1944) produced thousands of graduates. At a large conference in Philadelphia in 1919, Riley founded the World Christian Fundamentals Association (WCFA), which became the chief interdenominational fundamentalist organization in the 1920s. Some mark this conference as the public start of Christian fundamentalism. Although the fundamentalist drive to take control of the major Protestant denominations failed at the national level during the 1920s, the network of churches and missions fostered by Riley showed that the movement was growing in strength, especially in the U.S. South. Both rural and urban in character, the flourishing movement acted as a denominational surrogate and fostered a militant evangelical Christian orthodoxy. Riley was president of WCFA until 1929, after which the WCFA faded in importance. The Independent Fundamental Churches of America became a leading association of independent U.S. fundamentalist churches upon its founding in 1930. The American Council of Christian Churches was founded for fundamental Christian denominations as an alternative to the National Council of Churches.

Much of the enthusiasm for mobilizing fundamentalism came from Protestant seminaries and Protestant "Bible colleges" in the United States. Two leading fundamentalist seminaries were the Dispensationalist Dallas Theological Seminary, founded in 1924 by Lewis Sperry Chafer, and the Reformed Westminster Theological Seminary, formed in 1929 under the leadership and funding of former Princeton Theological Seminary professor J. Gresham Machen. Many Bible colleges were modeled after the Moody Bible Institute in Chicago. Dwight Moody was influential in preaching the imminence of the Kingdom of God that was so important to dispensationalism. Bible colleges prepared ministers who lacked college or seminary experience with intense study of the Bible, often using the Scofield Reference Bible of 1909, a King James Version of the Bible with detailed notes which interprets passages from a Dispensational perspective.

Although U.S. fundamentalism began in the North, the movement's largest base of popular support was in the South, especially among Southern Baptists, where individuals (and sometimes entire churches) left the convention and joined other Baptist denominations and movements which they believed were "more conservative" such as the Independent Baptist movement. By the late 1920s the national media had identified it with the South, largely ignoring manifestations elsewhere. In the mid-twentieth century, several Methodists left the mainline Methodist Church and established fundamental Methodist denominations, such as the Evangelical Methodist Church and the Fundamental Methodist Conference (cf. conservative holiness movement); others preferred congregating in Independent Methodist churches, many of which are affiliated with the Association of Independent Methodists, which is fundamentalist in its theological orientation. By the 1970s Protestant fundamentalism was deeply entrenched and concentrated in the U.S. South. In 1972–1980 General Social Surveys, 65 percent of respondents from the "East South Central" region (comprising Tennessee, Kentucky, Mississippi, and Alabama) self-identified as fundamentalist. The share of fundamentalists was at or near 50 percent in "West South Central" (Texas to Arkansas) and "South Atlantic" (Florida to Maryland), and at 25 percent or below elsewhere in the country, with the low of nine percent in New England. The pattern persisted into the 21st century; in 2006–2010 surveys, the average share of fundamentalists in the East South Central Region stood at 58 percent, while, in New England, it climbed slightly to 13 percent.

Evolution 
In the 1920s, Christian fundamentalists "differed on how to understand the account of creation in Genesis" but they "agreed that God was the author of creation and that humans were distinct creatures, separate from animals, and made in the image of God." While some of them advocated the belief in Old Earth creationism and a few of them even advocated the belief in evolutionary creation, other "strident fundamentalists" advocated Young Earth Creationism and "associated evolution with last-days atheism." These "strident fundamentalists" in the 1920s devoted themselves to fighting against the teaching of evolution in the nation's schools and colleges, especially by passing state laws that affected public schools. William Bell Riley took the initiative in the 1925 Scopes Trial by bringing in famed politician William Jennings Bryan and hiring him to serve as an assistant to the local prosecutor, who helped draw national media attention to the trial. In the half century after the Scopes Trial, fundamentalists had little success in shaping government policy, and they were generally defeated in their efforts to reshape the mainline denominations, which refused to join fundamentalist attacks on evolution. Particularly after the Scopes Trial, liberals saw a division between Christians in favor of the teaching of evolution, whom they viewed as educated and tolerant, and Christians against evolution, whom they viewed as narrow-minded, tribal, obscurantist.

Edwards (2000), however, challenges the consensus view among scholars that in the wake of the Scopes trial, fundamentalism retreated into the political and cultural background, a viewpoint which is evidenced in the movie "Inherit the Wind" and the majority of contemporary historical accounts. Rather, he argues, the cause of fundamentalism's retreat was the death of its leader, Bryan. Most fundamentalists saw the trial as a victory rather than a defeat, but Bryan's death soon afterward created a leadership void that no other fundamentalist leader could fill. Unlike the other fundamentalist leaders, Bryan brought name recognition, respectability, and the ability to forge a broad-based coalition of fundamentalist religious groups to argue in favor of the anti-evolutionist position.

Gatewood (1969) analyzes the transition from the anti-evolution crusade of the 1920s to the creation science movement of the 1960s. Despite some similarities between these two causes, the creation science movement represented a shift from religious to pseudoscientific objections to Darwin's theory. Creation science also differed in terms of popular leadership, rhetorical tone, and sectional focus. It lacked a prestigious leader like Bryan, utilized pseudoscientific argument rather than religious rhetoric, and was a product of California and Michigan rather than the South.

Webb (1991) traces the political and legal struggles between strict creationists and Darwinists to influence the extent to which evolution would be taught as science in Arizona and California schools. After Scopes was convicted, creationists throughout the United States sought similar anti-evolution laws for their states. These included Reverends R. S. Beal and Aubrey L. Moore in Arizona and members of the Creation Research Society in California, all supported by distinguished laymen. They sought to ban evolution as a topic for study, or at least relegate it to the status of unproven theory perhaps taught alongside the biblical version of creation. Educators, scientists, and other distinguished laymen favored evolution. This struggle occurred later in the Southwest than in other US areas and persisted through the Sputnik era.

In recent times, the courts have heard cases on whether or not the Book of Genesis's creation account should be taught in science classrooms alongside evolution, most notably in the 2005 federal court case Kitzmiller v. Dover Area School District. Creationism was presented under the banner of intelligent design, with the book Of Pandas and People being its textbook. The trial ended with the judge deciding that teaching intelligent design in a science class was unconstitutional as it was a religious belief and not science.

The original fundamentalist movement divided along clearly defined lines within conservative evangelical Protestantism as issues progressed. Many groupings, large and small, were produced by this schism. Neo-evangelicalism, the Heritage movement, and Paleo-Orthodoxy have all developed distinct identities, but none of them acknowledge any more than an historical overlap with the fundamentalist movement, and the term is seldom used of them. The broader term "evangelical" includes fundamentalists as well as people with similar or identical religious beliefs who do not engage the outside challenge to the Bible as actively.

Christian right 

The latter half of the twentieth century witnessed a surge of interest in organized political activism by U.S. fundamentalists. Dispensational fundamentalists viewed the 1948 establishment of the state of Israel as an important sign of the fulfillment of biblical prophecy, and support for Israel became the centerpiece of their approach to U.S. foreign policy. United States Supreme Court decisions also ignited fundamentalists' interest in organized politics, particularly Engel v. Vitale in 1962, which prohibited state-sanctioned prayer in public schools, and Abington School District v. Schempp in 1963, which prohibited mandatory Bible reading in public schools. By the time Ronald Reagan ran for the presidency in 1980, fundamentalist preachers, like the prohibitionist ministers of the early 20th century, were organizing their congregations to vote for supportive candidates.

Leaders of the newly political fundamentalism included Rob Grant and Jerry Falwell. Beginning with Grant's American Christian Cause in 1974, Christian Voice throughout the 1970s and Falwell's Moral Majority in the 1980s, the Christian Right began to have a major impact on American politics. In the 1980s and 1990s, the Christian Right was influencing elections and policy with groups such as the Family Research Council (founded 1981 by James Dobson) and the Christian Coalition (formed in 1989 by Pat Robertson) helping conservative politicians, especially Republicans, to win state and national elections.

In Australia 

In Australia, there are a few examples of the more extreme, American-style fundamentalist cult-like forms of Pentecostalism. The counter marginal trend, represented most notably by the Logos Foundation led by Howard Carter in Toowoomba, Queensland, and later by "manifest glory" movements can be found in congregations such as the Range Christian Fellowship.

The Logos Foundation, an influential and controversial Christian ministry, flourished in Australia in the 1970s and 1980s under the leadership of Howard Carter, originally a Baptist pastor from Auckland in New Zealand. Logos Foundation was initially a trans-denominational charismatic teaching ministry; its members were primarily Protestant but it also had some ties with Roman Catholic lay-groups and individuals.

Logos Foundation was Reconstructionist, Restorationist, and Dominionist in its theology and works.
Paul Collins established the Logos Foundation  in New Zealand as a trans-denominational teaching ministry which served the Charismatic Renewal by publishing the Logos Magazine.  Paul Collins moved it to Sydney in Australia, where it also facilitated large trans-denominational renewal conferences in venues such as Sydney Town Hall and the Wentworth Hotel. It was transferred to Howard Carter's leadership, relocating to Hazelbrook in the lower Blue Mountains of New South Wales, where it operated for a few years, and in the mid-1970s, it was transferred to Blackheath in the upper Blue Mountains. During these years the teaching ministry attracted like-minded fellowships and home groups into a loose association with it.

Publishing became a significant operation, distributing charismatic-themed and Restorationist teachings focused on Christian maturity and Christ's pre-eminence in short books and the monthly Logos/Restore Magazine (associated with New Wine Magazine in the United States). It held annual week-long conferences of over 1,000 registrants, featuring international charismatic speakers, including Derek Prince, Ern Baxter, Don Basham, Charles Simpson, Bob Mumford, Kevin Conner (Australia), Peter Morrow (New Zealand) and others.

A Bible college was also established nearby at Westwood Lodge, Mount Victoria. At the main site in Blackheath, a Christian K–12 school, Mountains Christian Academy was established which became a forerunner of more widespread Christian independent schools and home-schooling as a hallmark of the movement. It carried over the Old Covenant practice of tithing (to the local church), and expected regular sacrificial giving beyond this.

Theologically the Logos Foundation taught orthodox Christian core beliefs – however, in matters of opinion Logos teaching was presented as authoritative, and alternative views were discouraged. Those who questioned this teaching eventually tended to leave the movement. Over time, a strong cult-like culture of group conformity developed and those who dared to question it were quickly brought into line by other members who gave automated responses which were shrouded in spiritualised expressions. In some instances the leadership enforced unquestioning compliance by engaging in bullying-type behavior. The group viewed itself as being separate from "the world" and it even regarded alternative views and other expressions, denominations or interpretations of Christianity with distrust at worst but considered most of them false at best.

From the mid-1970s a hierarchical ecclesiology was adopted in the form of the Shepherding Movement's whole-of-life discipleship of members by personal pastors (usually their "cell group" leaders), who in turn were also accountable to their personal pastors. Followers were informed that even their leader, Howard Carter, related as a disciple to the apostolic group in Christian Growth Ministries of Bob Mumford, Charles Simpson, Ern Baxter, Derek Prince, and Don Basham, in Ft Lauderdale, US (whose network was estimated to have approx. 150,000 people involved at its peak ). Howard Carter's primary pastoral relationship was with Ern Baxter, a pioneer of the Healing Revival of the 1950s and of the Charismatic Renewal of the 1960s, 1970s, and 1980s. Written covenants of submission to the individual church pastors were encouraged for the members of one representative church, Christian Faith Centre (Sydney), and were said to be common practice throughout the movement at the time.

In 1980 the Logos movement churches adopted the name "Australian Fellowship of Covenant Communities" (AFoCC), and were led through an eschatological shift in the early 1980s from the pre-millennialism of many Pentecostals (described as a theology of defeat), to the post-millennialism of the Presbyterian Reconstructionist theonomists (described as a theology of victory). A shift to an overt theological-political paradigm resulted in some senior leadership, including Pastor David Jackson of Christian Faith Centre Sydney, leaving the movement altogether. In the mid-1980s AFoCC re-branded yet again as the "Covenant Evangelical Church" (not associated with the Evangelical Covenant Church in the US). The Logos Foundation brand-name continued as the educational, commercial and political arm of the Covenant Evangelical Church.

The group moved for the final time in 1986 to Toowoomba in Queensland where there were already associated fellowships and a demographic environment highly conducive to the growth of extreme right-wing religio-political movements. This fertile ground saw the movement peak in a short time, reaching a local support base of upwards of 2000 people.

The move to Toowoomba involved much preparation, including members selling homes and other assets in New South Wales and the Logos Foundation acquiring many homes, businesses and commercial properties in Toowoomba and the Darling Downs.

In the process of relocating the organization and most of its members, he Covenant Evangelical Church absorbed a number of other small Christian churches in Toowoomba. Some of these were house churches/groups more or less affiliated with Carter's other organizations. Carter and some of his followers attempted to make links with Queensland Premier Joh Bjelke-Petersen (in office 1968–1987), a known Christian conservative, in order to further their goals.

Carter continued to lead the shift in eschatology to post-millennialism and prominently religio-political in nature. More of his leadership team left the movement as Carter's style became more authoritarian and cultish. Colin Shaw, who was a key member at this time, believed that Pastor Howard Carter was an "anointed man of God," and Shaw later became the "right-hand" man of Carter in his "outreach and missionary works" in Quezon City in the Philippines. Logos used a Filipino church, the Christian Renewal Center (a moderate Pentecostal/Charismatic church) as their base to advance and promote the teachings of the Shepherding Movement. With local assistance in the Philippines, Colin Shaw coordinated and sponsored (under the Christian Renewal Centre's name) conferences featuring Carter. Many poorly-educated and sincere Filipino pastors and locals, usually from small churches, were convinced to support the wider Logos movement with tithes that were collected from their limited funds. However, soon after the revelations of Howard Carter's scandalous immorality and corrupt lifestyle broke, the Filipino wing of Logos dissolved and its former members dispersed back into established local churches. Colin Shaw was said to have abandoned the Shepherding Movement at this time and for a time after that, he engaged in soul-searching and self-exile, fueled by severe guilt over the way the Filipino Christians were manipulated.

In 1989 Logos controversially involved itself in the Queensland state election, running a campaign of surveys and full-page newspaper advertisements promoting the line that candidates' adherence to Christian principles and biblical ethics was more important than the widespread corruption in the Queensland government that had been revealed by the Fitzgerald Inquiry. Published advertisements in the Brisbane newspaper The Courier-Mail at the time promoted strongly conservative positions in opposition to pornography, homosexuality, abortion and a return to the death penalty. Some supporters controversially advocated Old Testament laws and penalties. This action backfired sensationally, with many mainstream churches, community leaders and religious organizations distancing themselves from the Logos Foundation after making public statements denouncing it. At times the death penalty for homosexuals was advocated, in accordance with Old Testament Law. The Sydney Morning Herald later described part of this campaign when the Logos Foundation campaigned: "Homosexuality and censorship should determine your vote, the electorate was told; corruption was not the major concern." The same article quoted Carter from a letter he had written to supporters at the time, "The greenies, the gays and the greedy are marching. Now the Christians, the conservatives and the concerned must march also." These views were not new. An earlier article published in the Herald quoted a Logos spokesman in reference to the call for the death penalty for homosexuals in order to rid Queensland of such people, who stated "the fact a law is on the statutes is the best safeguard for society."

Although similar behaviors had existed previously, these last years in Queensland saw Logos Foundation increasingly developing cult-like tendencies. This authoritarian environment degenerated into a perverse and unbiblical abuse of power. Obedience and unhealthy submission to human leaders was cult-like in many ways and the concept of submission for the purpose of "spiritual covering" became a dominant theme in Logos Foundation teaching. The idea of spiritual covering soon degenerated into a system of overt abuse of power and excessive control of people's lives. This occurred despite growing opposition to the Shepherding movement from respected Evangelical and Pentecostal leaders in the United States, beginning as early as 1975. However, in Australia, through the Logos Foundation and Covenant Evangelical Church, this movement flourished beyond the time when it had effectively entered a period of decline in North America. Carter effectively quarantined followers in Australia from the truth of what had begun to play out in the U.S.A.

The movement had ties to a number of other groups including World MAP (Ralph Mahoney), California; Christian Growth Ministries, Fort Lauderdale; and Rousas Rushdoony, the father of Christian Reconstructionism in the United States. Activities included printing, publishing, conferencing, home-schooling and ministry-training. Logos Foundation (Australia) and these other organizations at times issued theological qualifications and other apparently academic degrees, master's degrees and doctorates following no formal process of study or recognized rigor, often under a range of dubious names that included the word "University." In 1987 Carter conferred on himself a Master of Arts degree which was apparently issued by the Pacific College Theological, an institution whose existence investigating journalists have failed to verify. Carter frequently gifted such "qualifications" to visiting preachers from the United States – including a PhD purportedly issued by the University of Oceania Sancto Spiritus. The recipient thereafter used the title of Doctor in his itinerant preaching and revival ministry throughout North America.

The Shepherding Movement worldwide descended into a cult-like movement characterized by manipulative relationships, abuse of power and dubious financial arrangements. It had been an attempt by mostly sincere people to free Christianity of the entrenched reductions of traditional and consumerist religion. However, with its emphasis on authority and submissive accountability, the movement was open to abuse. This, combined with spiritual hunger, an early measure of success and growth, mixed motives, and the inexperience of new leaders all coalesced to form a dangerous and volatile mix. Howard Carter played these factors skillfully to entrench his own position.

The Logos Foundation and Covenant Evangelical Church did not long survive the scandal of Howard Carter's standing down and public exposure of adultery in 1990. Hey (2010) has stated in his thesis: "Suggested reasons for Carter's failure have included insecurity, an inability to open up to others, arrogance and over confidence in his own ability." As with many modern evangelists and mega-church leaders, followers within the movement placed him on a pedestal. This environment where the leader was not subject to true accountability allowed his deception and double life to flourish unknown for many years. In the years immediately prior to this scandal, those who dared to question were quickly derided by other members or even disciplined, thus reinforcing a very unhealthy environment. When the scandal of Carter's immorality was revealed, full details of the lavish lifestyle to which he had become accustomed were also exposed. Carter's frequent travel to North America was lavish and extravagant, utilizing first-class flights and five-star hotels. The full financial affairs of the organization prior to the collapse were highly secretive. Most members had been unaware of how vast sums of money involved in the whole operation were channeled, nor were they aware of how the leaders' access to these funds was managed.

A significant number of quite senior ex-Logos members found acceptance in the now-defunct Rangeville Uniting Church. The congregation of the Rangeville Uniting Church left the Uniting Church to become an independent congregation known as the Rangeville Community Church. Prior to the Rangeville Uniting Church closing, an earlier split resulted in a significant percentage of the total congregation contributing to the formation of the Range Christian Fellowship in Blake Street in Toowoomba.

The Range Christian Fellowship in Blake Street, Toowoomba, has a reputation for exuberant worship services and the public manifestation of charismatic phenomena and manifestations that place it well outside of mainstream Pentecostal church expression. It is possibly one of the prime Australian examples of churches which are associated with the New Apostolic Reformation, a fundamentalist Pentecostal religious right wing movement which American journalist Forrest Wilder has described as follows: "Their beliefs can tend toward the bizarre. Some prophets even claim to have seen demons at public meetings. They've taken biblical literalism to an extreme." It operates in a converted squash-centre and was established on 9 November 1997 as a group which broke away from the Rangeville Uniting Church in Toowoomba over disagreements with the national leadership of the Uniting Church in Australia. These disagreements predominantly related to the ordination of homosexual people into ministry. The Range Christian Fellowship's diverse origins resulted in a divergent mix of worship preferences, expectations and issues. The church initially met in a Seventh-day Adventist Church hall before purchasing the property in Blake Street, leaving the congregation heavily indebted, often close to bankruptcy, and with a high turnover of congregants. The congregation attributes their continued avoidance of financial collapse to God's blessing and regards this as a miracle.

Whilst adhering to Protestant beliefs, the church supplements these beliefs with influences from the New Apostolic Reformation, revivalism, Dominion theology, Kingdom Now theology, Spiritual Warfare Christianity and Five-fold ministry thinking. Scripture is interpreted literally, though selectively. Unusual manifestations attributed to the Holy Spirit or the presence of "the anointing" include women (and at times even men) moaning and retching as though experiencing child birth, with some claiming to be having actual contractions of the womb (known as "spiritual birthing"). Dramatic and apocalyptic predictions regarding the future were particularly evident during the time leading up to Y2K, when a number of prophecies were publicly shared, all of which were proven false by subsequent events. Attendees are given a high degree of freedom, influenced in the church's initial years by the promotion of Jim Rutz's publication, "The Open Church," resulting in broad tolerance of expressions of revelation, a "word from the Lord" or prophecy.

At times, people within the fellowship claim to have seen visions – in dreams, whilst in a trance-like state during worship, or during moments of religious ecstasy – with these experiences frequently conveying a revelation or prophecy. Other occurrences have included people claiming to have been in an altered state of consciousness (referred to as "resting in the Lord" and "slain in the spirit" – among other names), characterized by reduced external awareness and expanded interior mental and spiritual awareness, often accompanied by visions and emotional (and sometimes physical) euphoria. The church has hosted visits from various Christian leaders who claim to be modern-day Apostles as well as from many others who claim to be prophets or faith healers. Perhaps surprisingly, speaking in tongues, which is common in other Pentecostal churches, also occurs but it is not frequent nor is it promoted; and it is rarely witnessed in public gatherings. Neo-charismatic elements are rejected elsewhere in classical Pentecostalism, such as the Prayer of Jabez, prosperity theology, the Toronto Blessing (with its emphasis on strange, non-verbal expressions), George Otis' Spiritual Warfare, the Brownsville Revival (Pensacola Outpouring), Morningstar Ministries, the Lakeland Revival, and the Vineyard group of churches, have been influential. The church has always been known for its vibrant and occasionally euphoric and ecstatic worship services, services featuring music, song, dancing, flags and banners. Range Christian Fellowship is part of the church unity movement in Toowoomba, with other like-minded churches (mainstream traditional denominations have a separate ecumenical group). This group, known as the Christian Leaders' Network, aspires to be a Christian right-wing influence group within the city, at the centre of a hoped-for great revival during which they will "take the city for the Lord." The Range Christian Fellowship has wholeheartedly thrown itself into citywide events that are viewed as a foundation for stimulating revival, which have included Easterfest, "Christmas the Full Story," and continuous 24-hour worship-events.

The church retains an impressive resilience which it has inherited from its Uniting Church, which has seen it weather difficult times. Its beliefs and actions, which place it on the fringes of both mainstream and Pentecostal Christianity, are largely confined to its Sunday gatherings and gatherings which are privately held in the homes of its members. Criticism of the church is regarded as a badge of honor by some of its members, because they view it in terms of the expected persecution of the holy remnant of the true church in the last days. The church continues to be drawn to, and to associate itself with fringe Pentecostal and fundamentalist movements, particularly those which originated in North America, most recently with Doug Addison's.
Addison has become known for delivering prophecies through dreams and unconventionally through people's body tattoos, and he mixes highly fundamentalist Christianity with elements of psychic spirituality.

By denomination

Independent Baptist

Conservative Holiness Movement 

Fundamental Methodism includes several connexions, such as the Evangelical Methodist Church and Fundamental Methodist Conference. Additionally, Methodist connexions in the conservative holiness movement herald the beliefs of "separation from the world, from false doctrines, from other ecclesiastical connections" as well as place heavy emphasis on practicing holiness standards.

Nondenominationalism 
In nondenominational Christianity of the evangelical variety, the word "biblical" or "independent" often appears in the name of the church or denomination. The independence of the church is claimed and affiliation with a Christian denomination is infrequent, although there are fundamentalist denominations.

Reformed fundamentalism 

Reformed fundamentalism includes those denominations in the Reformed tradition (which includes the Continental Reformed, Presbyterian, Reformed Anglican and Reformed Baptist Churches) who adhere to the doctrine of biblical infallibility and lay heavy emphasis on historic confessions of faith, such as the Westminster Confession.

Examples of Reformed fundamentalist denominations include the Orthodox Presbyterian Church and the Free Presbyterian Church of Ulster.

Criticism 
Fundamentalists' literal interpretation of the Bible has been criticized by practitioners of biblical criticism for failing to take into account the circumstances in which the Christian Bible was written. Critics claim that this "literal interpretation" is not in keeping with the message which the scripture intended to convey when it was written, and it also uses the Bible for political purposes by presenting God "more as a God of judgement and punishment than as a God of love and mercy."

Christian fundamentalism has also been linked to child abuse and mental illness as well as to corporal punishment, with most practitioners believing that the Bible requires them to spank their children. Artists have addressed the issues of Christian fundamentalism, with one providing a slogan "America's Premier Child Abuse Brand."

Fundamentalists have attempted and continue to attempt to teach intelligent design, a hypothesis with creationism as its base, in lieu of evolution in public schools. This has resulted in legal challenges such as the federal case of Kitzmiller v. Dover Area School District which resulted in the United States District Court for the Middle District of Pennsylvania ruling the teaching of intelligent design to be unconstitutional due to its religious roots.

See also 

 Bible Belt
 Christian eschatology
 Christian fascism
 Christian nationalism
 Christian reconstructionism
 Christian right
 Christian values
 Christian Zionism
 Conservative evangelicalism in the United Kingdom
 A. C. Dixon
 Evangelicalism
 Glossary of Christianity
 Hindu fundamentalism
 H. A. Ironside
 Islamic fundamentalism
 Jewish fundamentalism
 Dwight L. Moody
 Moderate Christianity
 Mormon fundamentalism
 Plymouth Brethren
 Reformed fundamentalism
 Reformed Baptist
 Religious abuse
 Religious intolerance
 Billy Sunday
 R. A. Torrey
 Traditionalist Catholicism
 True Orthodox church
 Zionism

References

Bibliography 
 Almond, Gabriel A., R. Scott Appleby, and Emmanuel Sivan, eds. (2003). Strong Religion: The Rise of Fundamentalisms around the World and text search
 Armstrong, Karen (2001). The Battle for God. New York: Ballantine Books. .
 Ballmer, Randall (2nd ed 2004). Encyclopedia of Evangelicalism
 Ballmer, Randall (2010). The Making of Evangelicalism: From Revivalism to Politics and Beyond, 120pp
 Ballmer, Randall (2000). Blessed Assurance: A History of Evangelicalism in America
 Beale, David O. (1986). In Pursuit of Purity: American Fundamentalism Since 1850. Greenville, SC: Bob Jones University (Unusual Publications). .
 Bebbington, David W. (1990). "Baptists and Fundamentalists in Inter-War Britain". In Keith Robbins, ed. Protestant Evangelicalism: Britain, Ireland, Germany and America c.1750-c.1950. Studies in Church History subsidia 7, 297–326. Oxford: Blackwell Publishers, .
 Bebbington, David W. (1993). "Martyrs for the Truth: Fundamentalists in Britain". In Diana Wood, ed. Martyrs and Martyrologies, Studies in Church History Vol. 30, 417–451. Oxford: Blackwell Publishers, .
 Barr, James (1977). Fundamentalism. London: SCM Press. .
 Caplan, Lionel (1987). Studies in Religious Fundamentalism. London: The MacMillan Press, .
 Carpenter, Joel A. (1999). Revive Us Again: The Reawakening of American Fundamentalism. Oxford University Press, .
 Cole, Stewart Grant (1931). The History of Fundamentalism, Greenwood Press .
 Doner, Colonel V. (2012). Christian Jihad: Neo-Fundamentalists and the Polarization of America, Samizdat Creative
 Elliott, David R. (1993). "Knowing No Borders: Canadian Contributions to Fundamentalism". In George A. Rawlyk and Mark A. Noll, eds. Amazing Grace: Evangelicalism in Australia, Britain, Canada and the United States. Grand Rapids: Baker. 349–374, .
 Dollar, George W. (1973). A History of Fundamentalism in America. Greenville: Bob Jones University Press.
 Hankins, Barry. (2008). American Evangelicals: A Contemporary History of A Mainstream Religious Movement, scholarly history excerpt and text search
 Harris, Harriet A. (1998). Fundamentalism and Evangelicals. Oxford University. .
 
 Hughes, Richard Thomas (1988). The American quest for the primitive church 257pp excerpt and text search
 Laats, Adam (Feb. 2010). "Forging a Fundamentalist 'One Best System': Struggles over Curriculum and Educational Philosophy for Christian Day Schools, 1970–1989", History of Education Quarterly, 50 (Feb. 2010), 55–83.
 Longfield, Bradley J. (1991). The Presbyterian Controversy. New York: Oxford University Press. .
 Marsden, George M. (1995). "Fundamentalism as an American Phenomenon". In D. G. Hart, ed. Reckoning with the Past, 303–321. Grand Rapids: Baker.
 Marsden; George M. (1980). Fundamentalism and American Culture. Oxford: Oxford University Press. ; the standard scholarly history; excerpt and text search
 Marsden, George M. (1991). Understanding Fundamentalism and Evangelicalism excerpt and text search
 
 McLachlan, Douglas R. (1993). Reclaiming Authentic Fundamentalism. Independence, Mo.: American Association of Christian Schools. .
 Noll, Mark (1992). A History of Christianity in the United States and Canada.. Grand Rapids: Wm. B. Eerdmans Publishing Company. 311–389. .
 Noll, Mark A., David W. Bebbington and George A. Rawlyk eds. (1994). Evangelicalism: Comparative Studies of Popular Protestantism in North America, the British Isles and Beyond, 1700–1990.
 Rawlyk, George A., and Mark A. Noll, eds. (1993). Amazing Grace: Evangelicalism in Australia, Britain, Canada, and the United States.
 Rennie, Ian S. (1994). "Fundamentalism and the Varieties of North Atlantic Evangelicalism". in Mark A. Noll, David W. Bebbington and George A. Rawlyk eds. Evangelicalism: Comparative Studies of Popular Protestantism in North America, the British Isles and Beyond, 1700–1990. New York: Oxford University Press. 333–364, .
 
 Ruthven, Malise (2007). Fundamentalism: A Very Short Introduction excerpt and text search
 Sandeen, Ernest Robert (1970). The Roots of Fundamentalism: British and American Millenarianism, 1800–1930, Chicago: University of Chicago Press, 
 Seat, Leroy (2007). Fed Up with Fundamentalism: A Historical, Theological, and Personal Appraisal of Christian Fundamentalism. Liberty, MO: 4-L Publications. 
 
 Stackhouse, John G. (1993). Canadian Evangelicalism in the Twentieth Century
 Trollinger, William V. (1991). God's Empire: William Bell Riley and Midwestern Fundamentalism excerpts and text search
 Utzinger, J. Michael (2006). Yet Saints Their Watch Are Keeping: Fundamentalists, Modernists, and the Development of Evangelical Ecclesiology, 1887–1937, Macon: Mercer University Press, 
 Witherup, S. S., Ronald, D. (2001). Biblical Fundamentalism: What Every Catholic Should Know, 101pp excerpt and text search
 Woods, Thomas E. et al. "Fundamentalism: What Role did the Fundamentalists Play in American Society of the 1920s?" in History in Dispute Vol. 3: American Social and Political Movements, 1900–1945: Pursuit of Progress (Gale, 2000), 13pp online at Gale.
 Young, F. Lionel, III, (2005). "To the Right of Billy Graham: John R. Rice's 1957 Crusade Against New Evangelicalism and the End of the Fundamentalist-Evangelical Coalition". Th. M. Thesis, Trinity Evangelical Divinity School.

Primary sources 
 Hankins, Barr, ed. (2008). Evangelicalism and Fundamentalism: A Documentary Reader excerpt and text search
 Torrey, R. A., Dixon, A. C., et al. (eds.) (1917). The Fundamentals: A Testimony to the Truth partial version at web.archive.org. Accessed 2011-07-26.
 Trollinger, William Vance Jr., ed. (1995). The Antievolution Pamphlets of William Bell Riley. (Creationism in Twentieth-Century America: A Ten-Volume Anthology of Documents, 1903–1961. Vol. 4.) New York: Garland, 221 pp. excerpt and text search

External links 

 
 
 A. C. Dixon, Chicago Liberals and the Fundamentals by Gerald L. Priest
 Christian Fundamentalism and the Media
 Earliest Written Version of The Five Essentials
 Fundamentalism Profile
 The Fundamentals: A Testimony to the Truth Online version of "The Fundamentals", not complete at 2011-07-26.
 The Fundamentals: A Testimony to the Truth
 WELS Topical Q&A: Essential Christian Doctrine (A Confessional Lutheran perspective)

 
Christian terminology
Christian theological movements
Christian new religious movements
Anti-Catholicism
Protestantism in the United States
Protestantism in the United Kingdom
Protestantism in South Korea
Discrimination against atheists